The Mahabharata is a 1989 film version of the Hindu epic Mahabharata directed by Peter Brook. Brook's original 1985 stage play was 9 hours long, and toured around the world for four years. In 1989, it was reduced to under 6 hours for television (TV mini series). Later it was also reduced to about 3 hours for theatrical and DVD release. The screenplay was the result of eight years' work by Peter Brook, Jean-Claude Carrière and Marie-Hélène Estienne.

Plot

In general terms, the story involves epic incidents between two warring families, the Pandavas (representing the good side) and the Kauravas (representing the evil side). Both sides, being the offspring of kings and gods, fight for dominion. They have both been advised by the god Krishna to live in harmony and abstain from the bloody lust for power. Yet their fights come to threaten the very order of the Universe. The plot is framed by a dialogue between the Brahmin sage Vyasa and the Hindu deity Ganesha, and directed towards an unnamed Indian boy who comes to him inquiring about the story of the human race.

Cast

Robert Langdon Lloyd as Vyasa
 as Boy
Bruce Myers as Ganesha/Krishna
Vittorio Mezzogiorno as Arjuna
Andrzej Seweryn as Yudhishthira
Mamadou Dioumé as Bhima
Georges Corraface as Duryodhana
Jean-Paul Denizon as Nakula
 as Sahadeva
Mallika Sarabhai as Draupadi
Miriam Goldschmidt as Kunti
 as Dhritarashtra
Hélène Patarot as Gandhari
Myriam Tadesse as Gandhari's servant
Urs Bihler as Dushasana
Lou Elias Bihler as Young Karna
Jeffrey Kissoon as Karna
Maurice Bénichou as Kitchaka
 as Drona
Sotigui Kouyaté as Parashurama / Bhishma
Tuncel Kurtiz as Shakuni
Ciarán Hinds as Ashwatthama
Erika Alexander as Madri / Hidimbi
 as The Sun / Rakshasa / Ghatotkacha
Tapa Sudana as Pandu/Shiva
Akram Khan as Ekalavya
Nolan Hemmings as Abhimanyu
Hapsari Hardjito as Utari (Abhimanyu's wife)
Mas Soegeng as Virata
Yumi Nara as Virata's wife
Amba Bihler as Virata's daughter
Tamsir Niane as Urvasi
Lutfi Jakfar as Uttara
Gisèle Hogard as 1st princess
Julie Romanus as 2nd princess
 as Salvi
Ken Higelin as Deathless boy
 as Amba / Sikhandin
Joseph Kurian as Dhristadyumna
Clément Masdongar as Gazelle
Leela Mayor as Satyavati
Velu Vishwananan as The hermit

Production
The French and eventual English version of the Mahabharata took several years for Brook and Carrière to write and bring to the stage. Three years before the film version was made, Peter Brook staged their adaptation in French at a quarry in Avignon, France. This and the eventual filmed version were the first time that the entire (albeit abridged) story of the Mahabharata was brought to the stage and made into a feature film. In his book In Search of the Mahabharata: Notes of Travels in India with Peter Brook 1982-1985, Carrière speaks about the difficulty of adapting the Sanskrit into the European languages, particularly in regards to choosing the right words for certain terms. An example of this is atman, which is translated in the adaptation as depth of one’s being.

Using an elaborate-yet-minimal set and multi-racial cast from 16 different countries for the film, Brook's Mahabharata stood in contrast with the "opulently religious melodrama" of the 94-episode BR Chopra version of the Mahabharata which aired a year before the Brook-Carrière adaptation appeared on TV. Along with one Indian actress, other actors of Caucasian, African, Asian ancestry filled the cast of Brook's version, including Vittorio Mezzogiorno as Arjuna, Sotigui Kouyaté as Bhishma, and Tapa Sudana as both Pandu and Lord Shiva.

While working on the adaptation, Marie-Hélène Estienne travelled across Nepal and India, journeying from Manipur to Kanchipuram, in order to learn of the many different forms of the ancient epic from "Brahmins and writers and dancers and theatre people" across the subcontinent. Music composer Tsuchitori Toshiyuki remained in India for months on request from Brook make sure the play would "not use the music which everybody knows". Musicians from Iran, Turkey, and Denmark joined the production in order to score musical elements discovered by Tsuchitori, who was particularly influenced by Rabindra Sangeet.

Reception
The film version of the Mahabharata received a 20-minute standing ovation at the 1989 Venice Film Festival and received an Emmy Award after the film was aired on TV. The production's use of an international cast caused heated intercultural debate. On the topic of the multi-racial cast, Mumbai-based writer and critic Sanjukta Sharma writes: "The epic becomes intelligible and universal – and tells us why something as captivatingly human as the Mahabharata should not belong just to one nation or race."

Awards
In 1990, the film won the award for Performing Arts of the International Emmy Awards and the Audience Award for Best Feature at the São Paulo International Film Festival.

References

External links

The Mahabharata at miracosta.cc.ca.us
Mahabharata film notes at web.cocc.edu
Review of Brook's Mahabharata in Caravan Magazine
 

1989 films
Indian historical drama films
Religious epic films
Films based on the Mahabharata
Hindu mythological films
Films directed by Peter Brook
Films with screenplays by Jean-Claude Carrière
Films set in India
Historical epic films
1980s historical drama films
Indian epic films
1980s English-language films